George Webster may refer to:

Politicians
George T. Webster (active from 2007), Canadian politician in the Legislative Assembly of Prince Edward Island
George Webster (New Zealand politician) (died 1875), New Zealand politician
George Harry Webster (1869–1933), Mayor of Calgary, 1922–1926

Sportspeople
George Webster (swimmer) (1885–1941), British swimmer
George Webster (American football) (1945–2007), American football player

Others
George Webster (medical practitioner) (died 1876), British doctor
George Webster (architect) (1797–1864), British architect
George Amon Webster (1945–2013), baritone vocalist and pianist
George Webster (painter) (1797–1832), British maritime painter
George Webster, wrote the original story for the 2005 film Valiant
George Webster (actor) (born 1991), British actor
George D. Webster (USMC) (1919–1992), United States Marine Corps general